Francisco Javier de Istúriz y Montero (31 October 1790 in Cádiz – 2 April 1871 in Madrid) was a Spanish politician and diplomat who served as Prime Minister of Spain. He also served as the President of the Senate and President of the Congress of Deputies several times.

Footnotes

|-

|-

|-

|-

|-

|-

Prime Ministers of Spain
1790 births
1871 deaths
Presidents of the Congress of Deputies (Spain)
Moderate Party (Spain) politicians
19th-century Spanish politicians
Ambassadors of Spain to the United Kingdom of Great Britain and Ireland
Presidents of the Senate of Spain